Valença is a municipality located in the Brazilian state of Rio de Janeiro. The city is the seat of the Roman Catholic Diocese of Valença.

Valença has five districts: Conservatória ("City of Serenades"), Barão de Juparanã ("City of the Barons), Parapeúna, Santa Isabel do Rio Preto and Pentagna.
Today its economy is geared especially for agriculture and the existing university center in the municipal headquarters.

The municipality contains part of the  Serra da Concórdia State Park, created in 2002.

People 
 Tereza Nabuco; (1965-), costume design Black Brazilian Costume Designer
 Clementina de Jesus; (1901-1987), samba singer

References

Municipalities in Rio de Janeiro (state)